Kunda is a town and a Tehsil in Pratapgarh district in the Indian state of Uttar Pradesh.

Geography
It has an average elevation of 9 metres (291 feet). Kunda is not a very old town and probably was founded during the British Raj. Kunda is Located on Allahabad-Lucknow National Highway 24B. Place is developing as main commercial location in the region.

About 12 km away from Kunda there is a great temple known as Haudeswar Naath. There lies a natural shivling which is worshiped by Hindus all over India.

Just 2 km away from Haudeswar Naath Dhaam is Raja Bhaiya's Dr. Ambedkar Bird sanctuary, which is located in Benti village.

5 km north there is Mangarh Dham, where is newly built Bhakti Mandir is one of the most beautiful constructions in Uttar Pradesh. Kunda is 50 Kilometre away from Pratapgarh district and is a Taluka or Tahsil of Pratapgarh.
Kunda is also known for its mangoes locally known as "Dasahari aam".

Demographics
As of the 2011 Census of India, Kunda had a population of 910,447. Males constitute 50% of the population and females 50%. 72% of the whole population are from general caste 27% are from scheduled caste and 0%from scheduled tribe. Kunda has an average literacy rate of 66%, greater than the national average of 59.5%: male literacy is 59%, and female literacy is 41%. In Kunda, 14% of the population is under 6 years of age.

Government and politics
Raghuraj Pratap Singh, founder of Jansatta Dal (Loktantrik) party, is the Member of Legislative Assembly (MLA) from Kunda constituency in Uttar Pradesh Legislative Assembly since 1993.

Places of interest
 Jagadguru Kripalu Ji Maharaj (Bhakti Mandir Mangarh) at Mangarh in Kunda.
 Jagadguru Kripalu Chikitsalaya, Mangarh
 Jama Masjid at Parewa Naryanpur village in Kunda.

References

Cities and towns in Pratapgarh district, Uttar Pradesh